Novalnet is a payment service provider and a European payment institute that provides e-commerce businesses with electronic and point-of-sale payment processing services. The platform is designed to automate merchants' business processes across the e-commerce value chain, from checkout to debt collection.

Competitors are for example Adyen and Stripe.

Payment platform 

The Novalnet SaaS platform provides merchants with a solution for integrating payment services in pre- or self-developed systems, such as online shop, marketplace, content management system (CMS), customer relationship management (CRM), enterprise resource planning (ERP) and inventory management software (WAWI). Business model-based integration via API (application programming interface), iFrame, SDKs (software development kit) and WebView establish a real-time data flow between systems for individual payment processing, fraud prevention and other payment related services.

History 

Novalnet was founded in 2007 by Gabriel Dixon.The global company network employs 200 people in four different countries: Novalnet AG (Headquarters) in Germany, Novalnet Ltd. in the UK, Novalnet Payment Corp. in the US, and Novalnet E-Solutions Pvt. Ltd in India.The company is independent of external investors and is led by Mr. Gabriel Dixon (CEO), who is also the chairman of the board. 

The name “Novalnet” stems from the word “nova” (Portuguese) which means “new” and refers to the ability to remain up to date and innovative in the fast-developing payment industry.

Growth 

The company has been profitable since 2008.Between 2011 and 2016, Novalnet received the "Usage Award” at the European MPE Awards, and was one of the nominees for the Bavarian SME Award hosted by the European Business Forum <. In 2011 Novalnet came first as the “Best Payment-Service Provider 2011” at the t3n Magazin Web Awards.

In 2017 Novalnet was awarded Deloitte's "Technology Fast 50” prize for high growth in turnover over the last four years.

In 2018 Novalnet received the “Best Payment service Provider” prize in the E-Commerce Berlin Awards. 

Novalnet AG's revenue grew by 37.82% in the first quarter of 2020, compared to the first quarter of 2019. Novalnet had grown its earnings by 28% in 2019 with a total revenue of 1.35 billion euros. The company was recognized as one of FOCUS Business Ranking's “German Growth Champion 2020" and “Growth Champion 2021”, indicating a significant increase in turnover between 2015 and 2019. The payment platform has received the “Software hosted in Germany” quality seal every year since 2019

In 2021 Novalnet received the E-Commerce Germany Awards in two categories: 1st place in the Best Solution for International Expansion category and 3rd place in the Best payment service provider category. Novalnet's Shopware plugin was featured as one of the best apps in the "App of the Week" section at Shopware Store. In February 2021, Novalnet was included in the book “Wirtschaftsstandort Freistaat Bayern”.

Licenses and certifications 

Novalnet AG is a licensed payment institute accredited by the Federal Financial Supervisory Authority (BaFin) and has the PCI DSS Level 1 certification.

See also  
 List of online payment service providers
 Payment gateway
 Payment service provider

References

External links 
 

Financial services companies based in Munich

Merchant services
Online payments

Business software
Financial technology
Payment service providers